Gelareh Zadeh (born 1971) is an Iranian-Canadian physician who is a professor and the Wilkins Family Chair in the Department of Surgery at the University of Toronto. She is a neurosurgeon-scientist at Toronto Western Hospital. In 2020, Zadeh became the first woman to be elected Chair of the Division of Neurosurgery at the University of Toronto.

Early life and education 
Zadeh was born in Iran. Her father is an economist and her mother is a nuclear chemist. She spent part of her childhood in the United Kingdom whilst her mother studied chemistry. Her family moved back to Iran at the start of the Iranian Revolution. Her mother was awarded a scholarship to return to England, where her family applied to immigrate to Canada. The Zadeh family arrived in Winnipeg in 1988. She completed her undergraduate medical degree at the University of Manitoba. She moved to the University of Toronto for her speciality training, and focused on neurosurgery. Whilst in Toronto, she worked toward a doctorate in medical sciences. Her doctoral research looked at the role of angiopoietins in astrocytoma angiogenesis. After earning her doctorate Zadeh moved to University College London as a UK Cancer Care Ontario Research Fellow. In London, she worked as a neurosurgeon in the UCL Queen Square Institute of Neurology.

Research and career 
Zadeh returned to Canada in 2008, and was appointed a Canadian Institutes of Health Research clinician at the Toronto Western Hospital. She leads a brain tumour clinic that focuses on skull base neuro-oncology. She serves as the director of the University Health Network and University of Toronto Brain Tumour Bank. She works with Vera Bril on the University Health Network Elizabeth Raab Neurofibromatosis Program. Zadeh was the first woman to be elected Chair of the Division of Neurosurgery at the University of Toronto in 2020.

Zadeh's research looks to understand the molecular mechanisms that underpin glioma angiogenesis and what regulates tumour metabolism. She has studied how cells derived from bone marrow support glioma vasculature. She has also studied how differentiation into macrophages and altered metabolisms impact response to anti-angiogenic therapy.

Academic service 
Zadeh has served as Scientific Chair of the Society for Neuro-Oncology, Secretary of the Society for Neuro-Oncology and Chair of the World Federation of Neurological Surgeons Neuro-oncology Committee. She was appointed President of the Society of Neuro-Oncology in 2020. She has campaigned to get more women involved with neurosurgery.

Selected publications

Personal life 
Zadeh is married to a physician and has two daughters.

References 

1971 births
Living people
21st-century Canadian physicians
Academic staff of the University of Toronto
Iranian emigrants to Canada
University of Manitoba alumni
Canadian neurosurgeons